The 1992–93 Indiana Hoosiers men's basketball team represented Indiana University. Their head coach was Bobby Knight, who was in his 22nd year. The team played its home games in Assembly Hall in Bloomington, Indiana, and was a member of the Big Ten Conference.

The Hoosiers finished the regular season with an overall record of 31–4 and a conference record of 17–1, finishing 1st in the Big Ten Conference. As the Big Ten Conference Champions, the Hoosiers were invited to participate in the 1993 NCAA tournament as a 1-seed, where IU advanced to the Elite Eight for the second year in a row.

Roster

Schedule/Results

|-
!colspan=8 style=| Regular Season
|-

|-
!colspan=8 style=| NCAA tournament

Awards and honors
Calbert Cheaney, Chicago Tribune Silver Basketball
 Calbert Cheaney, Adolph Rupp Trophy
 Calbert Cheaney, Naismith College Player of the Year
 Calbert Cheaney, USBWA College Player of the Year
 Calbert Cheaney, John R. Wooden Award
 Calbert Cheaney, Associated Press College Basketball Player of the Year
 Calbert Cheaney, State Farm Division I Player of the Year Award

Team players drafted into the NBA

References

Indiana Hoosiers men's basketball seasons
Indiana Hoosiers
Indiana
1992 in sports in Indiana
1993 in sports in Indiana